Bayi Kylin is a Chinese women's professional basketball club in the Women's Chinese Basketball Association, owned by the People's Liberation Army. The team has been based in Honggutan New District, Nanchang, Jiangxi since 2017.

The kylin (also spelled qilin) is a mythical animal in Chinese culture.

Season-by-season records

Current roster

Notable former players

Sui Feifei (2002–09)
Ren Lei (2002–08, 2009–10)
Zhang Xiaoni (2002–10)
Chen Nan (2002–14, 2016–17)
Shao Tingting (2005–08, 2010–11)
Song Xiaoyun (2010–13)
Sun Mengxin (2012–18)
Wang Siyu (2014–15)
Zhao Zhifang (2016–17)

References

 
People's Liberation Army
Women's Chinese Basketball Association teams